The 2017 Louisiana–Monroe Warhawks football team represented the University of Louisiana at Monroe in the 2017 NCAA Division I FBS football season. The Warhawks played their home games at Malone Stadium in Monroe, Louisiana, and competed in the Sun Belt Conference. They were led by second-year head coach Matt Viator. They finished the season 4–8, 4–4 in Sun Belt play to finish in a three-way tie for fifth place.

Previous season 
The Warhawks finished the 2016 season 4–8, 3–5 in Sun Belt play to finish in seventh place.

Schedule
Louisiana–Monroe announced its 2017 football schedule on March 1, 2017. The 2017 schedule consisted of five home and seven away games in the regular season. The Warhawks hosted Sun Belt foes Appalachian State, Arkansas State, Coastal Carolina, and Georgia State, and traveled to Idaho, Louisiana-Lafayette, Texas State, and South Alabama

The Warhawks hosted one of the four non-conference opponents, Southern Miss from Conference USA, and traveled to Auburn from the Southeastern Conference, Florida State from the Atlantic Coast Conference and Memphis from the American Athletic Conference.
 

The game between Florida State and Louisiana-Monroe set for September 9 was originally canceled due to inclement weather from Hurricane Irma, but the two schools agreed on November 7 to reschedule the game for December 2.
Schedule Source:

Game summaries

at Memphis

Southern Miss

at Louisiana–Lafayette

Coastal Carolina

at Texas State

Georgia State

at South Alabama

at Idaho

Appalachian State

at Auburn

Arkansas State

at Florida State

References

Louisiana-Monroe
Louisiana–Monroe Warhawks football seasons
Louisiana-Monroe Warhawks football